Belarus 24 is the state television and radio channel of Belarus. It was launched on 1 February 2005. It broadcasts primarily in Russian language programmes of other Belarusian state TV channels Belarus 1, Belarus 2, Belarus 3 and Belarus 5.

On 1 January 2013, Belarus TV was renamed Belarus 24.

On 10 June 2021 the channel was banned in Ukraine for allegedly inciting hostility and spreading misinformation about Ukraine.

References

External links
Official website
Belarus 24 at LyngSat Address

Television stations in Belarus
Television channels and stations established in 2005
Mass media in Minsk
Censorship in Ukraine